Erin Elizabeth Gee (born 1974) (born San Luis Obispo, California) is an American composer and vocalist. Among the fellowships she has held are the Guggenheim and the Radcliffe Institute Fellowships, and among the awards she has won for her compositions are the Rome Prize and the first prize of the International Rostrum of Composers. She was on the faculty of the University of Illinois in Urbana as Assistant Professor of Composition-Theory and is currently Associate Professor of Composition at Brandeis University.

Education
In 1997 Gee received her B.M. with honors and highest distinction in Piano Performance from the University of Iowa; there she also earned an M.A. in composition in 2002. In 2007, she earned her Ph.D. in music theory from the University of Music and Dramatic Arts, Graz, Austria  where she studied musical composition with Beat Furrer.

Career
With her brother Colin Gee, she performed at the Whitney Museum of Art and was a resident at the Montalvo Arts Center. She won the 2008 Rome Prize and was a Guggenheim Fellow in 2009. From 2010-2011, she was a fellow in composition at the Akademie Schloss Solitude in Stuttgart.  In 2015, she received the Charles Ives Fellowship of the American Academy of Arts and Letters. The puzzle video game app Blek contains excerpts of Erin Gee's work. Gee is one of the Kronos Quartet 50 for the Future composers.

A reviewer from the Harvard Gazette described a performance of Gee's work as "a young woman with a microphone in each hand performing a curious and captivating symphony of sound and song".

Selected works

Discography

Selected awards and grants
2022 Award in Music from the American Academy of Arts and Letters
2019 Koussevitsky Award
2017 Fromm Foundation Commission
2015 American Academy of Arts and Letters, Charles Ives Fellowship Recipient ( Charles Ives Prize )
2009 John Simon Guggenheim Fellowship, New York City.
2007 Rome Prize, The American Academy in Rome, Italy.
2007 International Rostrum of Composers “Selected Piece” (First Prize), Paris, France.
2007 Teatro Minimo Prize  (first round), Zurich Opera House

References

External links
Artist's website
 Erin Gee at IMDB
Erin Gee at AllMusic

American women composers
Living people
University of Iowa alumni
Radcliffe fellows
International Rostrum of Composers prize-winners
1974 births
University of Illinois Urbana-Champaign faculty
University of Graz alumni
Musicians from Iowa
21st-century American composers
21st-century American women musicians
21st-century women composers